Bråviken is a bay of the Baltic sea that is located near Norrköping in Östergötland, Sweden. It is an example of a fjard, a drowned shallow glacial valley.

References

Norrköping
Bays of the Baltic Sea
Fjards
Ramsar sites in Sweden